Wapwallopen is an unincorporated community in Conyngham Township, Luzerne County, Pennsylvania, United States.

It is named for a Lenni Lenape settlement that was established where Big Wapwallopen Creek feeds into the Susquehanna River. The name derives from Lenape òphalahpink 'place of white wild hemp'.

Pennsylvania Route 239 passes through the settlement.

References

External links
Wapwallopen.com

Pennsylvania populated places on the Susquehanna River
Unincorporated communities in Luzerne County, Pennsylvania
Unincorporated communities in Pennsylvania